Bud is a census-designated place (CDP) in Wyoming County, West Virginia, United States, along Barkers Creek and West Virginia Route 10. As of the 2010 census, its population was 487.

The community has the name of Bud Adams, a businessperson in the local logging industry.

References

Census-designated places in Wyoming County, West Virginia
Coal towns in West Virginia